Bothrops marajoensis, or the Marajó lancehead, is a species of venomous snake in the  family Viperidae. It is endemic to Brazil.

Geographic range
It is found in Brazil in the state of Pará.

The type locality is Severino, Marajó Island, Pará, Brazil.

References

Further reading
 Hoge, A.R. 1966 ["1965"]. Preliminary account on Neotropical Crotalinae (Serpentes: Viperidae). Memórias do Instituto Butantan 32: 109–184.

marajoensis
Endemic fauna of Brazil
Reptiles described in 1966